Laurentian Hills is a municipality in Eastern Ontario, Canada, on the Ottawa River in Renfrew County. It surrounds (by land) Deep River on the Ontario side of the river. The town is home to the Nuclear Power Demonstration nuclear power plant. The prototype nuclear power plant was operational 1962-1987 and has since then been shutdown for over 30 years, waiting for permanent disposal of the radioactive nuclear components. The municipality was formed on January 1, 2000, when the United Townships of Rolph, Buchanan, Wylie and McKay and the Village of Chalk River were merged.

Communities

The town comprises the communities of Chalk River, Meilleurs Bay, Moor Lake, Point Alexander, Rolphton, and Wylie.

Demographics 

Population trend: 
 Population in 2016: 2961
 Population in 2011: 2811
 Population in 2006: 2789
 Population in 2001: 2750
 Population in 1996:
 Chalk River: 974
 Rolphton, Buchanan, Wylie and McKay: 1810
 Population in 1991:
 Chalk River: 874
 Rolphton, Buchanan, Wylie and McKay: 1656

Trivia
An Ontario Historical Plaque in front of the School House Museum was erected by the province to commemorate the role of Steamboating on the Upper Ottawa in Ontario's heritage.

See also
List of townships in Ontario

References
Mercer, Jennifer. "Staying the Run: A History of Rolph, Buchanan, Wylie and McKay Townships."

External links

Lower-tier municipalities in Ontario
Municipalities in Renfrew County
Towns in Ontario